Joseph-Couillard Lislois (January 8, 1856 – February 4, 1935) was a Canadian politician in the province of Quebec.

Born in Montmagny, Canada East, the son of Charles-Couillard Lislois and Geneviève Nicol, Lislois was mayor of Montmagny from 1890 to 1896 and again from 1898 to 1901. He was elected to the Legislative Assembly of Quebec for Montmagny in 1897. He did not run in 1900 and was defeated in the 1908 election.

References

1856 births
1935 deaths
Quebec Liberal Party MNAs